Mukkudal is a panchayat town in Tirunelveli district in the Indian state of Tamil Nadu.

Geography
This village is situated 20 km west of Tirunelveli on the banks of the perennial river Tamirabarani.

Demographics  
 India census, Mukkudal had a population of 14,983. Males constitute 49% of the population and females 51%. Mukkudal has an average literacy rate of 88.15%, higher than the state average of 80.09%: male literacy is 93.80%, and female literacy is 82.89%. In Mukkudal, 11.11% of the population is under 6 years of age. It has  4,139 houses.

Town panchayat
Mukkudal was upgraded as Town Panchayat according to Tamil Nadu Panchayats Act, 1994 (ratifications to 73rd and 74th Amendment of the Constitution of India) after its establishment. Adding nearest villages: Sadayapuram, Singamparai, Kaliyankulam, Lakshmiyapuram to Mukkudal, Mukkudal Town Panchayat was established. Panchayat has 15 wards, and every wards have a member who is selected through Tamil Nadu local body elections.

Landmark
It has a large Muthumalai Amman Temple, the old temple Sriman Narayanaswamy Kovil and Raamaswami Kovil Temple.

Transport
Mukkudal is surrounded by many villages. Every village uses Mukkudal bus stand for catching the bus. Now the number of buses has been increased. The Kadayam route bus runs on Mukkudal way. Some of the buses depart from Mukkudal to Tirunelveli. A new bus stand is opened for Mukkudal this year. Bus service is not as good as other town panchayats.

Health
The major and big with advance systematic hospital that for Beedi workers. They are  providing totally for free services with standard services. This hospital was started by Former Central Minister. This lies at the bus stand of Mukkudal. There is an upgraded government primary health centre.

Schools
Sokkalal Higher Secondary School served to educate the people for decades, a few other schools like S.S.K.V Sala Pry. School, Deepa Matriculation School and Boovijesh School and St. Paul's Higher secondary school have risen over the years.

In popular culture
Mukkudal is featured in the climax of 2014 Tamil movie Aranmanai

References

Cities and towns in Tirunelveli district